Saturna may refer to:

 Saturna Island in the southern Gulf Islands, British Columbia, Canada
 Saturna, British Columbia, a community on Saturna Island
 Saturna (festival), an ancient pagan festival originated by Adam, according to Jewish rabbinic literature
 Saturna (comics), Rebirth version of DC Comics supervillain Eviless.

See also
 
 
 Saturn (disambiguation)
 Saturnalia